NM-2-AI (N-methyl-2-aminoindane) is a psychoactive drug and research chemical that has been sold online as a designer drug. It is a rigid analogue of methamphetamine.  It is a derivative of 2-aminoindane.

Pharmacology

Pharmacodynamics

NM-2-AI acts as a highly selective norepinephrine reuptake inhibitor and releasing agent in vitro''.

NM-2AI has high affinity (2.4 µM IC50) as a norepinephrine reuptake inhibitor but also has affinity as a TAAR1 receptor agonist (3.3 µM EC50), an Alpha-2A adrenergic receptor agonist (0.49 µM Ki) and as a binding agent at the 5-HT1A (3.6 µM Ki) and 5-HT2A (5.4 µM Ki) receptors

Pharmacokinetics

Metabolism
Scientists performed a study on N-methyl-2-aminoindane (NM2AI) metabolism in-silico and in-vivo, in order to identify the main metabolites to be screened in the different biological samples. They performed the in silico metabolism prediction of NM2AI using MetaSiteTM software and subsequently verified the presence of metabolites in the blood, urine and hair of mice after NM-2-AI administration. LC-HRMS analysis identified seven main metabolites in the urine. They were identified, by their accurate masses and fragmentation patterns, as 2-aminoindane (2AI), two hydroxy-2-AI and four hydroxy-NM-2-AI; one of the hydroxy-NM-2-AI and one of the hydroxy-2-AI underwent also to conjugation. NM-2-AI and 2-AI were also detected by LC-HRMS in the hair and blood

References 

2-Aminoindanes
Designer drugs
Entactogens and empathogens
Serotonin releasing agents